Vieux Ablaye Mbengue (born 19 May 1992) is a Senegalese professional footballer who plays as a striker for Saudi Arabian club Al-Arabi.

Career
Mbengue began his career at ASC Jaraaf before joining Sapins. In January 2015, Mbengue went on trial with Turkish First League side Adana Demirspor. On 24 February 2015, Mbengue signed for Russian Premier League side FC Terek Grozny. Mbengue made his professional debut on 2 May 2015 for Terek Grozny in their Russian Premier League game against FC Rostov, coming in as a substitute shortly before half-time for the injured Aílton. With 7 minutes left in the game, he scored the only goal of the match, giving his team a 1–0 away victory. In his first game in the starting lineup on 11 May 2015, he scored twice to help Terek beat FC Spartak Moscow with a score of 4–2.

On 27 May 2019 Mbengue signed a new three-year contract with Akhmat Grozny, keeping him in Grozny until the summer of 2022. In August 2020, Mbengue went AWOL from Akhmat Grozny.

On 29 March 2021, Mbengue joined Dinamo Minsk on loan until the end of the 2021 season from Akhmat Grozny.

On 5 October 2021, Dinamo Minsk announced that Mbengue had unilaterally terminated his loan deal with Dinamo Minsk, and contract with Akhmat Grozny, to join Maccabi Petah Tikva.

On 16 June 2022, Mbengue joined Saudi Arabian club Al-Arabi Unaizah.

Career statistics

Honours
 Gabon Championnat National D1 top scorer: 2013–14

References

External links
 

1992 births
Sportspeople from Thiès
Living people
Senegalese footballers
Association football forwards
Sapins FC players
FC Akhmat Grozny players
FC Dinamo Minsk players
Maccabi Petah Tikva F.C. players
Al-Arabi SC (Kuwait) players
Al-Arabi SC (Saudi Arabia) players
Russian Premier League players
Belarusian Premier League players
Israeli Premier League players
Saudi First Division League players
Senegalese expatriate footballers
Expatriate footballers in Gabon
Expatriate footballers in Russia
Expatriate footballers in Belarus
Expatriate footballers in Israel
Expatriate footballers in Kuwait
Expatriate footballers in Saudi Arabia
Senegalese expatriate sportspeople in Gabon
Senegalese expatriate sportspeople in Russia
Senegalese expatriate sportspeople in Belarus
Senegalese expatriate sportspeople in Israel
Senegalese expatriate sportspeople in Kuwait
Senegalese expatriate sportspeople in Saudi Arabia